Chiller Thriller was a kid-friendly horror showcase that aired on New York City television station WOR-TV (Channel 9) on Saturday mornings as early as 1974 and as late as 1977.

Background
It aired classic movies from the Universal and RKO vaults, as well as films from other studios. It had no connection with the more famous movie program Chiller on WPIX-TV, despite the similar-sounding titles. 

Ted Mallie was the off-screen announcer for most of its run, vocal Group "Children of the Night" with Mark Andrews performed Commercial breaks.

"Chiller Thriller" was also the title of a Saturday night movie on defunct station KCND-TV from as early as 1970 until the station went off the air in 1975.  It was on at 10 or 10:30 PM at various times. A day before KCND went off the air, the final movie was on August 30, 1975 and entitled "It Conquered the World" starring Peter Graves and Beverly Garland.

Movies
Some movies that were shown were:

Atom Age Vampire
Bela Lugosi Meets a Brooklyn Gorilla
The Body Snatcher (1945)
The Disembodied (1957)
Frankenstein Meets the Wolf Man
The Gamma People
Ghidrah, the Three-Headed Monster
Godzilla's Revenge 
Godzilla vs. the Sea Monster
I Married a Monster From Outer Space
The Invisible Man Returns 
It Came from Beneath the Sea 
It Came From Outer Space
King Kong vs. Godzilla
The Leopard Man
Man Beast (1956) 
The Man Who Could Work Miracles
The Man Who Turned to Stone
The Monolith Monsters
Monster on the Campus 
Son of Dracula
Son of Frankenstein
Son of Godzilla
The Return of Dracula
Ring of Terror
Things to Come (1936)
The Werewolf (1956)

References and footnotes

Horror movie television series
1974 American television series debuts
Culture of New York City
1977 American television series endings